Remember Me This Way is a 1974 album by Rock singer Gary Glitter. It features live concert performances from Glitter's 1973 Christmas show at The Rainbow in London and was released in conjunction with the movie/documentary of the same name that showed Glitter preparing for the tour. The album ends with a one-minute and 39-seconds edit of the studio recording of the title song, which follows on at the end of the live recording. It was Glitter's third top ten album, reaching a peak of #5 in his native UK.

2009 reissue
The album was reissued in 2009 under Airmail Records in conjunction with the reissues of Glitter, Touch Me & G.G.

Track listing
All tracks composed by Gary Glitter and Mike Leander; except where indicated
 "I'm the Leader of the Gang (I Am!)" - 4:54
 "Sidewalk Sinner" - 2:53
 "Baby Please Don't Go" (Big Joe Williams) - 4:15
 "Do You Wanna Touch Me? (Oh Yeah!)" - 4:16
 "The Wanderer" (Ernie Maresca) - 4:25
 "Rock & Roll, Pt. 1 & 2" (Medley) - 5:16
 "Hello, Hello, I'm Back Again" - 4:00
 "I Didn't Know I Loved You (Till I Saw You Rock and Roll)" - 4:40
 "I Love You Love Me Love" - 5:00
 "Remember Me This Way" (snippet from the commercial single version only) - 1:39

Tracks 1-9 recorded live in concert at The Rainbow, London, 1973.

Charts

References

1974 live albums
Gary Glitter albums
Bell Records albums